Alessandro Liddi (born August 14, 1988) is an Italian professional baseball third and first baseman for El Águila de Veracruz of the Mexican League. Liddi played for the Seattle Mariners of Major League Baseball (MLB) from 2011 through 2013, and for the Chinatrust Brothers of the Chinese Professional Baseball League (CPBL) in 2019. He is the first player born and raised in Italy to play in MLB and the CPBL.

Professional career

Seattle Mariners
Liddi was signed as a non-drafted free agent from Italy on September 9, 2005, by Seattle Mariners scouts Wayne Norton and Mauro Mazzotti. He finished tied for fourth in the Arizona League in hits with 57 and slugging percentage with a .500 clip, fifth in extra-base hits with 22 and tied for ninth in average batting .313. Liddi also led team with 13 doubles and recorded 15 multi-hit games, including eight season-high three-hit games. He had season-high eight game hitting streak, batting .469 from July 19 – 28. He hit his first career home run on July 20 against the Arizona League Angels. He hit .352 in 23 games in July. He hit .384 in 22 games at home, compared to .250 in 25 road games. Liddi was promoted to the Class-A Wisconsin Timber Rattlers on August 24, appearing in 11 games.

In , Liddi spent the entire season with Wisconsin. He led the Timber Rattlers in doubles with 28, RBIs with 52, at-bats with 400, games played with 113 and total bases. 41 percent of his hits went for extra-base hits. He recorded an RBI in six consecutive games from May 28 – June 2. He hit .282 in 23 games in the month of July.

He recorded a career-high five hits, going 5-for-5 with three runs scored and two doubles on June 14 against the Clinton LumberKings. In the month of June, he hit .312 with 12 runs scored, five extra-base hits and nine RBIs in 21 games. He hit .308 with 16 runs scored, 11 extra-base hits and 17 RBIs in 29 games in August. Liddi participated in the Mariners Arizona Fall League in Peoria, Arizona.

His batting average led all Mariners minor leaguers, while his 104 RBI tied with teammate Joe Dunigan for the organizational lead. Despite having the highest batting average among full-season minor league players, Liddi shared the California League batting title with Koby Clemens. He was named the California League Most Valuable Player, after ranking in the top-5 in the league in hits, doubles, on-base percentage, slugging percentage, extra-base hits, and runs scored. He recorded 53 multi-hit games, while also knocking in at least two runs 28 times. A native of Italy, Liddi played for Team Italy in the World Baseball Classic in March. In June he was one of four Mavericks on the California League All-Star Team, and in July he participated in the All-Star Futures Game in St. Louis, Missouri. At season's end, Liddi was named the Topps California League Player of the Year. He was also named the Mariners' Minor League Player of the Year in September. Liddi was selected by MLB.com as the Mariners Organization Player of the Year.

Liddi participated in his first Spring training with the Mariners in 2011. He hit grand slams in back-to-back games before being demoted to the Mariners' Triple-A affiliate, the Tacoma Rainiers, on March 12, 2011. In 8 Spring training games, Liddi hit for a .385 batting average and a .429 on-base percentage, with an OPS of .846.  Liddi began the 2011 season in Tacoma. He hit .259 with 30 home runs, 104 RBIs and a Pacific Coast League-leading 121 runs in Tacoma. Liddi was called up by the Seattle Mariners in September and made his MLB debut on September 7, becoming the first native Italian to play in MLB. He got his first career hit on September 9 against the Kansas City Royals. He hit his first career home run on September 19 against the Cleveland Indians. The following day, September 20, he hit his second career home run against the Minnesota Twins.

Liddi began 2013 as the Rainiers Opening Day third baseman. After hitting .267 with 9 HR and 37 RBI in 50 games over the first two months, Liddi was recalled on May 29. After appearing in 8 games, he was optioned back to Tacoma. He was used as a backup at first base for Kendrys Morales, and he was used off the bench, hitting 1–17 with a double and a walk. He appeared in 9 more games with Tacoma before being designated for assignment on June 28.

Baltimore Orioles
On July 6, 2013, Seattle traded Liddi and their No. 3 international slot ($277,500) to Baltimore for their No. 2 international slot ($351,200). He was optioned to Triple-A Norfolk, where in 49 games at first and third base, he hit .222 with 4 HR and 22 RBI. On September 6, after not earning a call-up when the rosters expanded, he was designated for assignment to make room for Chris Dickerson, and he was outrighted off the roster 2 days later. After the season, he became a minor league free agent.

Chicago White Sox
On November 14, 2013, Liddi signed a minor league deal with the Chicago White Sox. On May 12, 2014, Liddi was released by the White Sox after struggling to a .171/.203/.303 batting line in 22 games.

Los Angeles Dodgers
On May 16, 2014, Liddi signed a minor league contract with the Los Angeles Dodgers organization and was assigned to the AAA Albuquerque Isotopes. He wound up playing in 44 games for the Isotopes and 36 for the AA Chattanooga Lookouts. He hit .219 for the Isotopes and .216 for the Lookouts.

Kansas City Royals
On January 10, 2015, Liddi signed a minor league deal with the Kansas City Royals. He spent the season with the Double-A Northwest Arkansas Naturals, batting .287/.324/.474 in 128 games before electing free agency on November 7, 2015.

Baltimore Orioles (second stint)
On January 12, 2016, Liddi signed with the Baltimore Orioles organization on a minor league deal. The news broke on the same day that pitcher Wei-Yin Chen signed with the Miami Marlins and Gerardo Parra signed with the Colorado Rockies, both leaving the Orioles. He was released by the Orioles organization on April 1, 2016.

Tigres de Quintana Roo
On April 1, 2016, Liddi signed with the Tigres de Quintana Roo of the Mexican Baseball League. In December 2016, a Mexican reporter tweeted that Liddi would play for a Japanese team; however, nothing was too apparent, including which team he would play for. He batted .281/.349/.538 with 23 home runs and 91 RBI in 2016 and was a Mexican League All-Star.

Toros de Tijuana
On March 28, 2017, Liddi was traded to the Toros de Tijuana from the Tigres de Quintana Roo. Liddi batted .225/.335/.399 with 17 home runs and 65 RBI and was a LMB All-Star for the second straight year.

Return to Kansas City

On February 19, 2018, Liddi signed a minor-league deal with the Kansas City Royals. He was assigned to AA Northwest Arkansas Naturals for the 2018 season. Liddi elected free agency on November 2, 2018.

Chinatrust Brothers
On April 2, 2019, Liddi signed with the Chinatrust Brothers of the Chinese Professional Baseball League. He was later released by the team on June 4, 2019. In 33 games he hit .244/.279/.487 with 7 homeruns and 20 RBIs.

Leones de Yucatán
On June 8, 2019, Liddi signed with the Leones de Yucatán of the Mexican League. Liddi batted a stellar .344/.414/.606 with 12 home runs and 66 RBI in just 59 games for Yucatán. Liddi did not play in a game in 2020 due to the cancellation of the Mexican League season because of the COVID-19 pandemic. In 2021, Liddi slashed .315/.401/.580 with 16 home runs and 36 RBIs in 63 games. Liddi was released by the club on January 11, 2022, after informing them he would be taking the 2022 season off.

El Águila de Veracruz
On February 24, 2023, Liddi signed with El Águila de Veracruz of the Mexican League.

References

External links

1988 births
Living people
Albuquerque Isotopes players
Arizona League Mariners players
Atenienses de Manatí (baseball) players
Expatriate baseball players in Puerto Rico
Cardenales de Lara players
Expatriate baseball players in Venezuela
Charlotte Knights players
Charros de Jalisco players
Chattanooga Lookouts players
CTBC Brothers players
High Desert Mavericks players
Italian expatriate baseball players in Mexico
Italian expatriate baseball players in Taiwan
Italian expatriate baseball players in the United States
Leones de Yucatán players
Leones del Escogido players
Expatriate baseball players in the Dominican Republic
Liga de Béisbol Profesional Roberto Clemente infielders
Major League Baseball players from Italy
Major League Baseball first basemen
Major League Baseball left fielders
Major League Baseball third basemen
Mexican League baseball first basemen
Mexican League baseball left fielders
Mexican League baseball right fielders
Mexican League baseball third basemen
Northwest Arkansas Naturals players
Norfolk Tides players
People from Sanremo
Seattle Mariners players
Tacoma Rainiers players
Tomateros de Culiacán players
Toros de Tijuana players
Tigres de Quintana Roo players
Venados de Mazatlán players
Wisconsin Timber Rattlers players
West Tennessee Diamond Jaxx players
2009 World Baseball Classic players
2013 World Baseball Classic players
2016 European Baseball Championship players
2017 World Baseball Classic players
Italian expatriate sportspeople in Venezuela
Sportspeople from the Province of Imperia